Miele is a German manufacturer of high-end domestic appliances and commercial equipment, headquartered in Gütersloh, Ostwestfalen-Lippe. The company was founded in 1899 by Carl Miele and Reinhard Zinkann, and has always been a family-owned and family-run company.

History
Miele's first products were a cream separator, butter churn, and tub washing machine, under the Meteor brand. Carl Miele supervised manufacturing personally, and Reinhard Zinkann apprenticed and handled finances and sales.

In 1927, Miele started the production of vacuum cleaners. In 1929, the first electric dishwasher in Europe was produced. From 1930, motorcycles were built. In 1932, Miele was the largest centrifuge factory in Europe. During World War II, Miele produced control units for torpedoes of the German Kriegsmarine.

The Miele trademark was established with the foundation of Miele & Cie. company, on 1 July 1899, and appeared on all machines, nameplates, printed materials and advertising produced by the company. From the mid-1920s, a recognition feature of the logo has been a sloping dash used as the dot on the "i".

The trademark has remained unchanged apart from three minor alterations to reflect contemporary tastes. A survey by the Süddeutsche Zeitung, one of Germany's leading daily newspapers, found that the "i" alone was sufficient to identify the Miele brand.

Miele exports products to global markets and is represented in 47 countries. Their expansion into the United States came in 1983, when they established corporate headquarters in Somerset, New Jersey. In 1999, they relocated to the new headquarters in Princeton, which was designed by the Driehaus Prize winner Michael Graves. Most products are made in Germany or  Switzerland, Austria, the Czech Republic and Romania, there are ten showrooms in the United States.

Milestones 

1899 Foundation of Miele & Cie.; production of cream separators
1900 Production of butter churns and washing machines
1912-1914 Production of motorcars (125 vehicles)
1914 First washing machine with an electric motor; Branches set up in Brussels, Buenos Aires, Paris, Warsaw and Vienna
1924-1960 Production of bicycles and motorcycles in Bielefeld
1927 Production of first vacuum cleaners
1929 Production of Europe's first electric dishwasher 
1955 Dutch slogan "Miele. Er is geen betere" invented 
1956 First fully automatic washing machine
1958 First domestic tumble dryer
1963 Miele launches in the UK
1966 First humidity sensing dryer, the T 460
1976 First top-loading washer-dryer, the WT 489.
1978 First microprocessor-controlled washing machines, dryers, and dishwashers
1982 Launch of "The New Miele-class" with innovations like a 1,200 RPM spin speed, service friendly construction (hinged front)
1986 Introduction of the Hydromatic washing drum with perforated paddles in the drum, which increase washing performance
1987 Introduction of the world's first dishwasher with a cutlery tray, the G 595 SC
1988 First front-loading washer-dryer by Miele, the WT 745. Also in that year, Miele acquired the professional appliances manufacturer Cordes
1989 700-series washing machines refreshed with Novotronic electronic control
1990 Kitchen appliance manufacturer Imperial taken over
1991 900-series washing machines launched with Novotronic surface-mount devices technology. Also introduced in that year and with the 900-series: 1,600 RPM spin speed
1991 Developed and created the wet cleaning process in partnership with Kreussler Textile Chemistry
1997 First washing machine with a program for hand-washable woolens, and Miele InfoControl: the first mobile receiver to process data transmitted by Miele domestic appliances. WT 745 discontinued and succeeded by the WT 945
1998 First fully automatic built-in coffee maker by Miele, the CVA 620. Also in that year, Miele introduced a gas-fueled dryer for domestic use, the T 478 G
1999 First washing machine with a 1,800 RPM spin speed and brushless FU motor, the W397. Also that year, Miele celebrated their 100th anniversary
2001 Launch of the patented "SoftCare" honeycomb pattern drum
2003 Navitronic washing machines and tumble dryers with an "Automatic" program
2004 New G 1000/G 2000 dishwasher series using a patented production process
2005 TouchControl operation for dishwashers, cookers, steam cookers and microwaves, 37th Miele subsidiary set up in Korea. Kitchen production halted.
2006 New washing machine/tumble dryer series with innovative design
2013 New washing machine and dryer series called W1 and T1
2014 New slogan for The Netherlands, "Miele. Er is geen betere" has been changed to the international slogan, "Immer Besser"
2017 Miele launches Dialog Oven with M-Chef Technology and automatic menu cooking

Products

Miele produces domestic appliances including laundry appliances; vacuum cleaners; dishwashers; rotary irons; built-in convection, steam, and speed ovens; hobs (cooker hoods, cook tops); free-standing and built-in refrigerators, freezers, and wine coolers; and coffee systems. The company also produces commercial laundry equipment including wet cleaning machines, lab glassware washers, dental disinfectors, and medical equipment washers.

In 2007, Miele was given an award for being the most successful company in Germany that year, beating the previous year's winner Google, which placed second, and Porsche, which came in third.

Rankings for this Best Brands prize are the result of market research covering key criteria such as current economic market success and brand recognition and popularity among consumers. Miele was recognized as Best Company and also achieved a top-five place in the category Best Product Brand. Miele was honored as Best Domestic Appliance Brand in the UK by Which? in 2007 and again in 2008, being only one of two brands to win twice in a row. They have since won again in 2010.

In North America, Miele is marketed as a high-end major appliance brand. It competes against brands such as Küppersbusch, Sub-Zero, Wolf & Cove, Gaggenau, Fagor, Viking Range, Dacor, Asko, JennAir, and Thermador.

Slogans
Miele's slogan in German is immer besser, which literally translates to "always better" but can also mean "getting better and better".

See also

References

External links

German brands
Home appliance manufacturers of Germany
Home appliance brands
Vacuum cleaner manufacturers
Manufacturing companies established in 1899
Companies based in North Rhine-Westphalia
Gütersloh
German companies established in 1899